Crème de menthe (French for "mint cream") is a sweet, mint-flavored alcoholic beverage. It is available commercially in a colorless version (called "white") and a green version (colored by the mint leaves or by added coloring if made from extract instead of leaves).  Both varieties have similar flavor and are interchangeable in recipes, except where color is important. It is usually made with Corsican mint or peppermint, which is steeped in grain alcohol for several weeks before it is filtered and sweetened to create the final product. It typically has 25% alcohol by volume.

Crème de menthe is an ingredient in several cocktails, such as the Grasshopper and the Stinger. It is also served as a digestif and used in cooking as a flavoring (see Mint chocolate). It is also a primary component of the popular South African shooter known as the Springbokkie.

Music
Sergei Rachmaninoff, although otherwise a teetotaler, found that a glass of crème de menthe steadied his nerves when playing the technically demanding piano score in the twenty-fourth variation of his Rhapsody on a Theme of Paganini. He nicknamed the twenty-fourth the "Crème de Menthe Variation".

References 

Liqueurs
Herbal liqueurs